I Like Mountain Music is a 1933 Warner Bros. Merrie Melodies cartoon directed by Rudolf Ising. The short was released on June 14, 1933.

This cartoon is a follow-up to the 1932 short Three's a Crowd, in which literary characters came to life and stepped off their book covers. In this film, the characters on magazine covers come to life.

Plot
At night, the magazines at a drugstore come to life and put on a show. However, the man on the crime magazine seizes the opportunity to rob the cash. Now it's up to the sleuths of the detective magazine to catch him. Sherlock Holmes and Dr. Watson, among others, follow their trail.

Celebrity cameos include Edward G. Robinson, who is inside the pages of a crime magazine. Will Rogers comes in, twirling a lasso, and delivers his trademark line, "All I know is just what I read in the papers." Comedian Ed Wynn appears in an ad for "Vexico Quick-Exploding Gasoline" while Eddie Cantor takes off the beard of a violinist to reveal he's actually Rubinoff.  (At the time, Wynn's NBC radio show was sponsored by Texaco, with the tagline that the firm's product was "quick starting gasoline," and violinist/orchestra leader David Rubinoff was one of the featured players on Cantor's radio show for Chase and Sanborn—the "Jimmy" referred to by the Cantor caricature is probably Jimmy Wallington, the show's announcer.) In the last minute of the cartoon, Mussolini is shown briefly making a fascist salute, directing mustachioed soldiers (armed with bayonets) to chase the bad guys.

References

External links
 

1933 films
Merrie Melodies short films
1930s Warner Bros. animated short films
1930s American films